Parada de Gonta is a Portuguese parish of the municipality of Tondela. The population in 2011 was 754, in an area of 6.73 km2.

References

Freguesias of Tondela
Populated places in Viseu District